Mount Simsarian is a large mountain projecting from the east side of Michigan Plateau just south of the head of Gardiner Glacier. Mapped by United States Geological Survey (USGS) from surveys and U.S. Navy air photos, 1960–64. Named by Advisory Committee on Antarctic Names (US-ACAN) for James Simsarian, Chief, Division of International Scientific and Technical Affairs, Department of State in recognition of his outstanding work as chief spokesman for the United States at the meetings that produced the 12-nation Treaty on the Antarctic. This honor was bestowed on Dr. Simsarian at his retirement from the U.S. State Department after a quarter-century of distinguished service.

Mountains of Marie Byrd Land